Rex Airlines Pty Ltd is an Australian airline based in Mascot, New South Wales. It operates scheduled regional and domestic services. It is Australia's largest regional airline outside the Qantas group of companies and serves all 6 states across Australia. It is the primary subsidiary of Regional Express Holdings.

History

The airline was established in 2002 when the Australiawide Airlines consortium (set up by former Ansett Australia employees) acquired Hazelton Airlines and Kendell Airlines, before merging the companies and starting operations as Rex in August 2002. In 2005, Australiawide Airlines was renamed Regional Express Holdings and partially floated on the Australian Securities Exchange. On 30 November 2005, Rex announced the acquisition of the Dubbo-based Air Link, another regional airline.

In October 2007, Rex expanded into Queensland when it commenced operations between Brisbane and Maryborough. This exacerbated an existing problem within the company of not having enough pilots to crew its flights (due to the expansion of larger airlines, especially Jetstar and Virgin Blue), and Rex suspended operations out of Brisbane (and from Sydney to Cooma during the summer "low season" for this route to the NSW ski fields) in November 2007. To provide a medium-term solution to the pilot shortage, Rex announced that it was establishing a cadet-pilot flight-training programme.

In November 2015, Rex announced the resumption of services to the NSW Snowy Mountains in conjunction with Snowy Mountains Airport Corporation, with the flights resuming in March 2016. In December 2015, Rex announced that it would be commencing operations in Western Australia in February the following year after being selected by the Government of Western Australia to be the operator of regulated RPT routes after a tender process. Initially operating between Perth to Albany and Esperance, in July 2018 the Western Australian operations expanded to include Carnarvon and Monkey Mia. It brought Rex's weekly flights to roughly 1,500 across 60 destinations.

Starting on 6 April 2020, Rex significantly scaled back all its regional services due to the COVID-19 pandemic, continuing to only offer Government subsidised services within Queensland and Western Australia and one flight a week between all 54 regional and remote communities within its route network. Services including Adelaide to Port Augusta, Sydney to Newcastle and Sydney to Armidale were suspended.

In June 2020, eyeing the demise of Tigerair Australia, Rex announced interest in expanding into the domestic airline market, with operations to commence in 2021 between Sydney, Melbourne and Brisbane. Rex leased six Boeing 737-800s previously leased by Virgin Australia to operate the new services, with the first delivered in November 2020. The first jet operations began on 1 March 2021 on the Melbourne to Sydney route. Also in June 2020, Rex announced that it had entered into a memorandum of understanding with ATR to explore options for replacing the Saab 340 fleet with ATR 42 and ATR 72 aircraft. Following the airline's launch of jet services in March 2021, Rex replaced the announced Brisbane jet services in early April with services to Adelaide and Gold Coast, with the start of services occurring between 29 March and 1 April.

On 15 July 2022, Rex announced its intent to purchase National Jet Express, a Fly-In, Fly-Out/Charter airline.

Regional Express Holdings

Regional Express Holdings Limited is the parent company of a number of airline and associated companies in Australia. It is based in Mascot, New South Wales (a suburb of Sydney) and is a public listed company on the Australian Stock Exchange. Regional Express Holdings arose from the 2001 collapse of Ansett Airlines, which was the parent company of Kendell Airlines and Hazelton Airlines. A group of Singaporean investors and a collection of Australian private investors purchased the Hazelton and Kendell businesses, which were profitable entities before they were taken over by Ansett. The investors formed Australiawide Airlines, which was officially incorporated on 12 February 2002. The assets of the two airlines were purchased by Australiawide and merged to form the airline Regional Express, known as Rex. In 2005 Australiawide offered a percentage of the owners' shares (35 million out of 115 million shares, or 30.43%) to the public in a float. At the same time an agreement was reached with the owners of Pel-Air that Australiawide would purchase Pel-Air.

As part of the public float process, Australiawide Airlines' name was changed to Regional Express Holdings. Regional Express Holdings is the owner of a number of other companies. The main asset is Regional Express Pty. Ltd.. Another company is Rex Freight and Charter Pty. Ltd., which is the company that owns National Jet Express and Pel-Air. The third subsidiary company is Rex Investment Holdings Pty. Ltd., which owns the Australian Airline Pilot Academies in Wagga Wagga and Ballarat.

Destinations

Rex Airlines initially offered regional flights from various bases across Australia using turboprop aircraft, but in March 2021 began flying between its bases using jet aircraft with flights between Melbourne and Sydney. Their current domestic flights consist of destinations in Melbourne, Sydney, Brisbane, Canberra, Gold Coast and Adelaide.

Fleet

Current fleet
, the Rex Airlines fleet consists of the following aircraft:

Former fleet
Rex Airlines has previously operated the following aircraft:
 Fairchild Metro 23 - 7 inherited from Kendell Airlines, retired 2006.

Fleet development
Rex operates the world's largest fleet of Saab 340 aircraft. The delivery of 25 ex-American Eagle Airlines Saab 340B Plus aircraft started in mid-2007 and enabled the expansion of services and the phase-out of the airline's Saab 340As, and some older B models. The 340B Plus has a quieter and more comfortable interior.

In July 2008 the company announced that all of its 340As would be phased out; however one rejoined the fleet in July 2015 after a 7-year stint with Rex's subsidiary airline Pel-Air and remains in service as of January 2020.

The airline also previously operated some Fairchild Metro 23 aircraft seating 19 passengers, but the aircraft were later phased out.

By October 2020, the airline operated an all-Saab 340 fleet with three variants of the type, though prior in the year during June 2020, Rex announced it was leasing six Boeing 737-800s with the first delivered in November 2020, and the further five to be delivered by March 2021 in order to begin operations with jet aircraft.

Incidents and accidents
On 21 February 2016, a Regional Express Airlines Saab 340B, registered VH-ZLA, was forced to take evasive action to avoid a glider while operating from Orange Airport. The Australian Transport Safety Bureau (ATSB) found the Rex aircraft was climbing through 7,500 ft after departing Orange when the crew sighted the glider in "close proximity", and took evasive action.

On 17 March 2017, the right propeller sheared off a Regional Express Saab 340B, tail number VH-NRX, while operating flight ZL768 from Albury to Sydney. The pilot made a pan-pan call but was able to land the plane without incident. The ATSB after investigating found a fatigue crack in the engine's propeller mounting flange.

On 29 August 2019, a Regional Express Saab 340B, registration VH-RXX, the crew received a right engine fire indication followed by a loud bang while they were shutting the engine down. The aircraft landed at the planned destination of Merimbula without further incident. The ATSB discovered that the indication and subsequent engine failure was caused by an internal oil fire weakening the turbine blades.

Flight school

In November 2007, Regional Express Airlines and Mangalore Airport Pty Limited created a joint venture pilot academy called the Civil Aviation Training Academy, based at Mangalore Airport in Victoria. In April 2008, Regional Express Airlines fully acquired the Civil Aviation Training Academy and it was renamed to Australian Airline Pilot Academy.

On 18 February 2009, Regional Express Airlines announced that the Australian Airline Pilot Academy (AAPA) would be relocated from Mangalore Airport to Wagga Wagga Airport in partnership with the City of Wagga Wagga starting in April 2009.

On 27 May 2010, the AAPA campus at Wagga Wagga Airport was officially opened by Federal Minister for Infrastructure, Transport, Regional Development and Local Government, Anthony Albanese.

On 19 November 2019, AAPA purchased ST Aerospace Academy Australia at Ballarat Airport in Victoria, taking it over as a second campus.

In addition to training aircraft, the flight school has five flight simulators, including a full motion Saab 340 simulator. There is also one retired Saab 340B at Wagga Wagga used as a training aid.

Training fleet
, the Australian Airline Pilot Academy operates the following aircraft:

See also
List of airlines of Australia

References

Bibliography
Thorn, Jim. "Interview - Michael Jones, CEO Regional Express". Australian Aviation magazine, No. 187, September 2002, pp. 30–34. Aerospace Publications Pty. Ltd. ISSN 0813-0876

External links

Airlines established in 2002
Australian companies established in 2002
Regional Aviation Association of Australia
Companies based in Sydney